Orašje Planje is a village in the municipalities of Teslić (Republika Srpska) and Tešanj, Bosnia and Herzegovina.

Demographics 
According to the 2013 census, its population was 900, all living in Tešanj.

References

Populated places in Tešanj
Populated places in Teslić